Sylvía Rún Hálfdánardóttir (born 20 September 1998) is an Icelandic former basketball player and a former member of the Icelandic national basketball team.

Playing career
Sylvía Rún came up through the junior ranks of Haukar and broke into the senior team in 2012. She played with Haukar until 2016, winning the Icelandic Basketball Cup in 2014 and the Icelandic Company Cup in 2015.

After starting the 2016-2017 season with Stjarnan, she stepped away from basketball after three games for personal reasons but returned to the team the following season where she went on to average 11.0 points and 7.6 rebounds in 12 games.

In September 2018, Sylvía Rún joined 1. deild kvenna club Þór Akureyri. On 5 January 2019, Sylvía posted a quadruple-double with 11 points, 13 rebounds, 10 assists and 10 steals in a victory against Njarðvík. On 16 March 2019, she scored a career high 40 points in a 70-67 victory against Hamar. For the season she averaged 21.7 points, 12.3 rebounds and 5.1 assists. After the season she was named to the 1. deild kvenna Domestic All-First Team.

In May 2019, Sylvía signed with reigning national champions Valur. She averaged 10.3 points and 6.6 rebounds in 22 games for Valur before the season was canceled due to the coronavirus pandemic in Iceland. Following the season, she retired from competitive basketball.

National team career
In 2016, she was named to the Tournament All-First team during the 2016 FIBA U18 Women's European Championship Division B after leading Iceland to a 4th place finish. During the tournament she averaged 16.7 points, 10.7 rebounds and 3.4 steals. Her best game came against Finland where she had 28 points and 20 rebounds. From 2016 to 2019, she appeared in 4 games for the Icelandic national basketball team.

Personal life
Sylvía's parents, Hálfdán Markússon and Sóley Indriðadóttir, both played basketball for Haukar. Her sister, Margrét Rósa Hálfdánardóttir, played college basketball for Canisius College and played 12 games for the Icelandic national team.

Awards, titles and accomplishments

Individual awards
Division I Domestic All-First Team: 2019
U18 European Championship Division B All-First team: 2016

Titles
Icelandic Basketball Cup: 2014
Icelandic Company Cup: 2015
Icelandic Super Cup: 2019

References

External links
Icelandic statistics
FIBA Profile

1998 births
Living people
Forwards (basketball)
Sylvía Rún Hálfdánardóttir
Sylvía Rún Hálfdánardóttir
Sylvía Rún Hálfdánardóttir
Sylvía Rún Hálfdánardóttir
Sylvía Rún Hálfdánardóttir